Yudisleivi Reyes Hernández (born 10 April 1989) is a Cuban retired footballer who played as a midfielder. She has been a member of the Cuba women's national team.

International career
Reyes capped for Cuba at senior level during the 2010 CONCACAF Women's World Cup Qualifying qualification.

References

1989 births
Living people
Cuban women's footballers
Cuba women's international footballers
Women's association football midfielders
21st-century Cuban women